Andre Kaup is an electrical engineer at the University of Erlangen-Nuremberg in Erlangen, Bavaria. He was named a Fellow of the Institute of Electrical and Electronics Engineers (IEEE) in 2013 for his contributions to video coding and object-based video signal processing.

References 

Fellow Members of the IEEE
Living people
RWTH Aachen University alumni
Engineers from Nuremberg
Year of birth missing (living people)
Academic staff of the University of Erlangen-Nuremberg